Cadabra might refer to:
Cadabra (computer program), a computer algebra system for field theory problems
Cadabra Design Automation, a former EDA company purchased by Numerical Technologies
Cadabra, Inc., now Amazon.com, Inc.

See also
Abracadabra (disambiguation)
Kadabra (disambiguation)